Clino Trini Castelli (born Civitavecchia, 1944) is an Italian industrial designer and artist. He has used the concept of "noform" through his work in environmental and industrial design, developed through the application of tools such as Design Primario and CMF design.

Career 
Having obtained his school leaving certificate at the Scuola Centrale Allievi Fiat in Turin, in 1961 Castelli started working at the Centro Stile of Fiat Automobiles, and after three years moved to Olivetti in Milan, in the studio of Ettore Sottsass. At the same time he was part of the growing Arte Povera movement in Turin, comparing himself with artists like Michelangelo Pistoletto,<ref name=":0">{{cite book |author-link =Romy Golan  |last =Golan | first = Romy  | url = https://www.academia.edu/7194890 | title = Flashbacks and Eclipses in Italian Art in the 1960s | work  = Grey Room | publisher = MIT Press Journal | date = Fall 2012 | number = 49 | pages = 102–127}}</ref> Piero Gilardi and Alighiero Boetti. In Milan he worked in fashion, meeting Nanni Strada and Elio Fiorucci. With the latter in 1967 he founded the Intrapresa Design company. From 1969 to 1973 he devised the Red Books, the first manuals developed in the metaproject format, which led to the creation of Olivetti's corporate identity programme. In 1973 with Andrea Branzi and Massimo Morozzi, he created the Centro Design Montefibre; with the same partners a year later he started the CDM (Consulenti Design Milano) company, which became Castelli Design in 1983. In 1978 he founded the Colorterminal IVI di Milano, the first centre to use the new RGB technologies and CMF design, and four years later formed the Gruppo Colorscape for urban planning. Throughout the 1980s he worked with Louis Vuitton and Vitra in Europe, Herman Miller in the United States and Mitsubishi in Japan. During this period he re-established his partnership with Fiat, which led to the creation in 1985 of the Centro di Qualistica Fiat, the "Qualistic Compendium" programme with Olivetti and CMF product range planning with Cassina. At the same time he was one of the first in Europe to look at the concept of domotics, or home automation, developed with Bticino, Legrand and Somfy. During the 1990s he started new design ventures in Japan with Hitachi, Toli and Itoki. In parallel with this, he taught design at the Politecnico di Milano and the Domus Academy, of which he was one of the founders in 1983. From 1994 to 2005 he wrote articles on design culture for the magazine Interni. In 2000 he founded the Qualistic Lab, a division of Castelli Design that developed new instruments for the emotional positioning of images and products.

 Awards 

 ADI Compasso d'Oro award for Meraklon Sistema "Fibermatching 25", Centro Design Montefibre, 1979
 ADI Compasso d'Oro award for Abito Politubolare, Calza Bloch, 1979
 Interior Design Magazine Annual Award for Showroom Design, Herman Miller. Neocon XV, Chicago, 1983
 IBD Product Design Gold Award for Color, Fabric, Finish Program for Seating, CMF Design for Fabric Collection, Herman Miller Inc., 1984
 Intel Design '99 award for the CMF Design of the products Wood & Metal, Sfera Modulare and Metal & Metal, Bticino, 1999
 IF Product Design Gold Award for Hitachi Enterprise Server EP8000 Series, Hitachi, 2007
 IF Product Design Award 2011 for VSP – Virtual Storage Platform, Hitachi, 2011
 Machine Design Award 2011 Grand Prize, Japan / Ministry of Economy, Trade and Industry for VSP – Virtual Storage Platform, Hitachi, 2011

 Writings 
 Transitive Design, A Design Language for the Zeroes, Milan: Electa, 1999
 Worldscape. The new domotic landscape, Milan: Nava, 2006
 Observatory on Interni n. 445–550, Milan: Mondadori, 1994–2005

 Bibliography 
 Akiko Takehara, The "Philosopher of Color" Clino Castelli, on: Car Styling n. 48, Los Angeles: Car Styling Publishing, 1984, pp. 13–36
 John Thackara, Designing without form, on: Design n. 440, August 1985, pp. 38–39
 Mikio Kuranishi, Clino Castelli. Great Design of the World, Bekkan Taiyo n. 30, Tokyo, December 1989, pp. 98–99
 Thomas C. Mitchell, New Thinking In Design, Conversations on Theory and Practice'', New York: Van Nostrand Reinhold, 1996, pp. 60–71
 Guido Musante, Mater Materia 2, on: Interni n. 649, Milan: Mondadori, 2015, pp. 62–65

References 

Italian industrial designers
Italian designers
People from Civitavecchia
1944 births
Living people